"Sinner" is the debut solo single by New Zealand singer/songwriter, Neil Finn, released in 1998.

An acoustic version of the song was performed live and released on Radio Austin 107.1 KGSR's "Broadcasts Vol. 6" album.

Track listings
Sinner
Astro
808 Song
Identical Twin

References 

1998 singles
Neil Finn songs
Songs written by Neil Finn
1998 songs